Texas blues is blues music from Texas. As a regional style, its original form was characterized by jazz and swing influences. Later examples are often closer to blues rock and Southern rock.

History

Texas blues began to appear in the early 1900s among African Americans who worked in oilfields, ranches and lumber camps. In the 1920s, Blind Lemon Jefferson innovated the style by using jazz-like improvisation and single string accompaniment on a guitar; Jefferson's influence defined the field and inspired later performers. During the Great Depression in the 1930s, many bluesmen moved to cities including Galveston, San Antonio, Houston and Dallas. It was from these urban centers that a new wave of popular performers appeared, including slide guitarist and gospel singer Blind Willie Johnson. Future bluesmen such as Lightnin' Hopkins, Lil' Son Jackson, and T-Bone Walker were influenced by these developments. Robert Johnson's two recording sessions both took place in Texas, although he was from Mississippi.

T-Bone Walker relocated to Los Angeles to record his most influential work in the 1940s. His swing-influenced backing and lead guitar sound became an influential part of the electric blues. It was T-Bone Walker, B.B. King once said, who “really started me to want to play the blues. I can still hear T-Bone in my mind today, from that first record I heard, ‘Stormy Monday.’ He was the first electric guitar player I heard on record. He made me so that I knew I just had to go out and get an electric guitar.” He also influenced Goree Carter, whose "Rock Awhile" (1949) featured an over-driven electric guitar style and has been cited as a strong contender for the "first rock and roll record" title.

The state's R&B recording industry was based in Houston with labels such as Duke/Peacock, which in the 1950s provided a base for artists who would later pursue the electric Texas blues sound, including Johnny Copeland and Albert Collins. Freddie King, a major influence on electric blues, was born in Texas, but moved to Chicago as a teenager. His instrumental number "Hide Away" (1961), was emulated by British blues artists including Eric Clapton.

In the late 1960s and early 1970s the Texas Blues scene began to flourish, influenced by country music and blues rock, particularly in the clubs of Austin. The diverse style often featured instruments such as keyboards and horns with emphasis on guitar soloing. The most prominent artists to emerge in this era were the brothers Johnny and Edgar Winter, who combined traditional and southern styles. In the 1970s, Jimmie Vaughan formed The Fabulous Thunderbirds and in the 1980s his brother Stevie Ray Vaughan broke through to mainstream success with his virtuoso guitar playing, as did ZZ Top with their brand of Southern rock.

See also
Music of Texas
Texas Roadhouse Music
List of Texas blues musicians

References

 
Blues music genres